Willem Carel Mauve (2 February 1803, Rotterdam – 24 February 1869, Haarlem), was a Mennonite minister and writer. He was the father of the painter Anton Mauve.

Biography
He served the congregations of Enschede from 1830 until 1836 and served in Zaandam (where his son Anton was born) before moving to Haarlem in 1839. There he became a member of Teylers First Society in 1844. 
He wrote several religious works, including a small catechism on Biblical history.

References

 W.C. Mauve author page on DBNL

1803 births
1869 deaths
Dutch Mennonites
Dutch Protestant ministers and clergy
Mennonite ministers
Members of Teylers Eerste Genootschap
Clergy from Rotterdam
Clergy from Haarlem
Dutch male writers
19th-century Anabaptist ministers
Mennonite theologians
Mennonite writers